Wernell Reneau (born 10 April 1965) is a Belizean former cyclist. He competed in the individual road race event at the 1984 Summer Olympics.

References

External links
 

1965 births
Living people
Belizean male cyclists
Olympic cyclists of Belize
Cyclists at the 1984 Summer Olympics
Place of birth missing (living people)